Eriocottis maraschensis is a moth in the Eriocottidae family. It was described by Rebel in 1936. It is found in the Taurus Mountains in Turkey.

References

Moths described in 1936
Eriocottidae
Moths of Asia